The Washington Court House City School District is a public school district serving Washington Court House, Ohio and surrounding areas. The district enrolls most school-age children within the city limits of Washington Court House.

Presently, operating school buildings include:

Sunnyside Kindergarten
Belle Aire Elementary
Eastside Elementary (held in modular buildings, as the old Eastside school has been demolished)
Rose Avenue Elementary 
Cherry Hill Elementary (held in the basement of the Washington Middle School, as the old Cherry Hill school has been demolished)
Washington Middle School
Washington High School

The district also operates a combination administrative office and school bus garage. Each first through fifth grader attends school at one of the four elementary schools, while grades 6-8 take place at the Middle School. Washington High School consists of students in grades nine through twelve.

External links
 Washington Court House City School District

School districts in Ohio
Education in Fayette County, Ohio
Washington Court House, Ohio